Little is known of Federico di Pagana, he came from the region of Rapallo on the Genoese Riviera, so it is unclear why he was chosen as doge after Nicolò Guarco was forced out of office on 7 April 1383. But the well-introduced and astute politician Leonardo Montaldo managed to have the election canceled and to be picked instead as the new doge. After this episode, Federico di Pagana disappears from the forefront of Genoese politics.

14th-century Doges of Genoa
1315 births
1406 deaths